Philipp Schey Freiherr von Koromla (20 September 1798 – 26 June 1881) was an Austro-Hungarian merchant and philanthropist. He was the first Hungarian Jew elevated into the Austrian nobility.

His daughter, Charlotte, was the mother of Hans Leo Przibram.

References

1798 births
1881 deaths
Austro-Hungarian Jews
Hungarian nobility
Barons of Austria